Netto in some European languages means net worth, net pay, or net weight. It may also refer to:

Arts and entertainment

Ambiguous (film), also known as Waisetsu Netto Shūdan Ikasete!!, a 2003 Japanese Pink film
Netto (film), a 2005 film set in Berlin
Netto Hikari, Japanese given name for the Mega Man Battle Network character Lan Hikari
Netto Houz, Berlin-based house music project
Netto Koshien, Japanese television program
Net Yaroze, known as Netto Yarōze in Japanese, a development kit for the PlayStation video game console

Companies

Netto-Bådene , an operator of canal tours in Copenhagen, Denmark
Netto (Les Mousquetaires), a French supermarket chain with stores also in Portugal
Netto Marken-Discount, a German supermarket chain owned by Edeka
Netto (store), a Danish discount supermarket operating in Denmark, Germany, Poland
Netto UK, a United Kingdom discount supermarket chain which was a 50:50 joint venture between Dansk Supermarked A/S and J Sainsbury plc
Netto Motors, an used car dealership in West Palm Beach, Florida United States

Places

Estádio Municipal João Lamego Netto, a multi-purpose stadium in Ipatinga, Brazil
Governor Bento Munhoz da Rocha Netto Hydroelectric Plant in Paraná, Brazil
Netto Arena, an indoor arena in Szczecin, Poland

Other
Austria Netto Katalog, Austrian collectors' catalog
Netto (surname)
Netto-uyoku, term used to refer to netizens who espouse right wing views on Japanese social media

See also
Neto (disambiguation)
Netta (disambiguation)
Netti (disambiguation)
Netty (disambiguation)